Humphrey Coningsby (c. 1623–?) was an English politician.

Humphrey Coningsby may also refer to:
Humphrey Coningsby (judge) (died 1535), English lawyer and judge
Humphrey Coningsby (died 1559), MP for Herefordshire
Humphrey Coningsby (died 1601), MP for St Albans